Edinburg is a town in Saratoga County, New York, United States. The town is in the northwestern part of the county and is northwest of Saratoga Springs. The town is located entirely in the Adirondack Park. The Batchellerville Bridge connects the two halves of the town, being divided by the Great Sacandaga Lake.

Etymology

The town is named after the city of Edinburgh in Scotland. The name was originally spelt as Edinburgh.

History 

Edinburg is located within the Adirondack Park on the shores of the Great Sacandaga Lake in northwestern Saratoga County.
    
The first recorded settlers arrived in the Sacandaga River Valley area via Fish House in 1787. Abijah Stark came with his family from Coleraine, Massachusetts and settled first just north of Fish House near the Providence town line. They were followed shortly by the Andersons, Westcotts, Randall and Bass families.

Many of the first residents had seen the valley before, when serving their country during the Revolutionary War. They had heard that land was cheap and "the living was better for less work."
    
Settlement on the west side of the river near Beecher's Hollow started in the early 1790s with the Sumner, Barker, Deming and Partridge families. Batchellerville on the east side started in the late 1790s and early 1800s with the Noyes, Gordon, Batcheller and DeGolia families---just to name a few.
  
The town was originally part of the Town of Providence, but the area quickly grew. In 1801 the settlers decided that the town was big enough to have a name of its own and at an informal meeting on March 13, 1801, it became Northfield. However, in 1808 it was renamed Edinburgh because another Northfield was discovered in New York State.

The first town meeting was held on April 7, 1801. Some of the laws enacted were to raise $50.00 to take care of the town's poor and that hogs could run at large. That law did not work out because at a town meeting in 1802 it was decided that hogs could run at large but should wear "a good and sufficient yoak." Boar hogs were not to run, after being two months old, after the first of May until the 25th of December. Every boar hog being found to run after the above date the owner of such hog was to pay $1.00 or forfeit the hog.

Ram sheep were also restricted from running at large from September until November. By March 1824 fence viewers were paid $.75 per day.

In February 1825, there was a special meeting, and it was voted unanimously that "we do not wish to comply with the Acts of the Legislature for the erection of a county poor house."
 
Farming, logging and woodenware manufacturing were the three largest industries. Batchellerville became a manufacturing community having several large woodenware mills. The area on the west side of the river tended to be more farming-oriented although some manufacturing was done in Beecher's Hollow and Tennantville. These two areas had large saw and woodenware mills.

The town was divided into several communities, most of which had their own school and often a cemetery as well. Some of these besides Beecher's Hollow and Batchellerville were: Tennantville, Edinburgh Hill, Clarkville, Sand Hill, Cold Brook, Anderson and Partridge Districts. Industry prospered until early in the 1880s when several terrible fires destroyed many of the mills and about one-third of the townspeople moved elsewhere to seek jobs.
 
By the early 1920s the handwriting was on the wall, a dam was to be built and the valley to be flooded, many more people moved away knowing they would lose their homes.

On March 27, 1930, the gates on the Conklingville Dam were closed and by 1931 what had once been a beautiful river valley with the many communities along its banks was lost forever as the Sacandaga Reservoir was created.
 
Tucked away in the northwestern part of Saratoga County, Edinburg has one of the few covered bridges left in New York State, the only one left in the county. Today the shores of the reservoir, renamed The Great Sacandaga Lake in the 60's, are dotted with hundreds and hundreds of seasonal homes. Only two farms remain with logging and tourism being the major industries.

Geography

The town is divided by the Great Sacandaga Lake and is linked by the Batchellerville Bridge carrying County Road 98 across the lake.  The western town line is the border of Fulton County.

Demographics

As of the census of 2010, there were 2,214 people, 547 households, and 471 families residing in the town. The racial makeup of the town was 98.8% White, 0.1% African American, 0.00% American Indian and Alaska Native, 0.1% Asian, 0.00% Pacific Islander, 0.00% from other races, and 0.8% from two or more races. Hispanic or Latino of any race were 0.4% of the population.

There were 547 households, out of which 17.7% had children under the age of 18 living with them, 64.2% were married couples living together, 5.9% had a female householder with no husband present, and 35.8% were non-families. 29.1% of all households were made up of individuals, and 14.4% had someone living alone who was 65 years of age or older.  The average household size was 2.22 and the average family size was 2.70.

The median age was 49.2 years.

(Note: The income information below are from the 2000 Census)
The median income for a household in the town was $39,762, and the median income for a family was $43,317. Males had a median income of $32,500 versus $24,732 for females. The per capita income for the town was $20,371.  About 5.7% of families and 8.3% of the population were below the poverty line, including 6.2% of those under age 18 and 8.2% of those age 65 or over.

Communities and locations in Edinburg 
Batchellerville – A hamlet on the eastern shore of the Great Sacandaga Lake, east of the Route 98 bridge. The Batchellerville Presbyterian Church was listed on the National Register of Historic Places in 2002.
Clarkville – A hamlet northwest of Edinburg village, near the western town line.
Edinburg (formerly called "Beechers Hollow") – A hamlet on the western side of the Great Sacandaga Lake on County Road 4 (North Shore Road). The Barker General Store was listed on the National Register of Historic Places in 2002 and the Eli and Diadama Beecher House in 2015.
Fox Hill – A location southeast of Batchellerville.
Plateau Sky Ranch Airport (1F2) – A turf runway airport northwest of Edinburg village.
Tenantville – A hamlet in the northern part of the town.
Thousand Acre Swamp – A location east of Fox Hill.
West Day – A hamlet on the eastern town line on County Road 4.

References

External links
  Town of Edinburg
  Early history of the Town of Edinburg

Towns in Saratoga County, New York
Adirondacks